Notovoluta kreuslerae, common name : Kreusler's volute, is a species of sea snail, a marine gastropod mollusk in the family Volutidae, the volutes.

Description
The size of an adult shell varies between 60 mm and 100 mm.

Distribution
This species is distributed along South Australia.

References

 Bail, P & Poppe, G. T. 2001. A conchological iconography: a taxonomic introduction of the recent Volutidae. Hackenheim-Conchbook, 30 pp, 5 pl

External links
 

Volutidae
Gastropods described in 1865